Eupanacra harmani is a moth of the  family Sphingidae. It is known from Sulawesi.

References

Eupanacra
Moths described in 1989